Sevce is a settlement in the Municipality of Laško in eastern Slovenia. It lies on the right bank of the Savinja River, north of Rimske Toplice. The area is part of the traditional region of Styria. It is now included with the rest of the municipality in the Savinja Statistical Region.

References

External links
Sevce on Geopedia

Populated places in the Municipality of Laško